The 2003 New Forest District Council election took place on 1 May 2003 to elect members to the New Forest District Council, on the same day as other local elections. The 2003 election saw new ward boundaries used which increased the number of seats by 2 to 60. The election saw the Conservatives win 32 seats out of the 31 required for a majority, with the Liberal Democrats winning 27 seats and one independent win.

Election Summary 
New ward boundaries came into effect for the election, which increased the number of seats by two. Prior to the election, a by-election took place in Pennington, which saw the Liberal Democrats gaining the seat from the Conservatives, meaning that prior to the election the Conservatives held 29 seats (50.00%), the Liberal Democrats held 36 seats (44.82%) and three independents held seats (5.17%). After the election, the Conservatives held 32 seats (53.33%) and the Liberal Democrats held 27 (45.00%), with only one independent hold (1.66%)

The Liberal Democrats performed best in the East of the district, as well as the North West, taking eight out of ten Totton seats, all six Hythe and Dibden seats, and all four seats in the Fawley, Blackfield and Holbury area. The Conservatives meanwhile performed well across the rest of the district.

The table below only tallies the votes of the highest polling candidate for each party within each ward. This is known as the top candidate method and is often used for multi-member plurality elections.

Ward Results

Ashurst, Copythorne South and Netley Marsh

Barton

Bashley

Becton

Boldre and Sway

Bramshaw, Copythorne North and Minstead

Bransgore and Burley

Brockenhurst and Forest South East

Buckland

Butts Ash and Dibden Purlieu

Dibden and Hythe East

Downlands and Forest

Fawley, Blackfield and Langley

Fernhill

Fordingbridge

Forest North West

Furzedown and Hardley

Holbury and North Blackfield

Hordle

Hythe West and Langdown

Lymington Town

Lyndhurst

Marchwood

Milford

Milton

Pennington

Ringwood East and Sopley

Ringwood North

Ringwood South

Totton Central

Totton East

Totton North

Totton South

Totton West

References 

2003 English local elections
New Forest District Council elections
2000s in Hampshire